Hrefna Huld Jóhannesdóttir (born 25 October 1980) is an Icelandic former footballer who played as a striker. She spent most of her career with KR and scored 179 goals in 220 Úrvalsdeild kvenna matches. In 2003, she won the Úrvalsdeild kvenna golden boot after scoring 21 goals in 14 matches. She played college football for Auburn Montgomery, and was named to the 2004 NAIA Women's Soccer All-American second team. From 2000 to 2005, she made ten appearances for the Iceland women's national football team. Hrefna retired from football in 2012 due to mental health issues.

National team career
Hrefna played ten games for the Icelandic national football team from 2000 to 2005, scoring three goals.

Honours

Club
Úrvalsdeild kvenna (4): 1997, 2000, 2002, 2003
Icelandic Women's Cup (3): 2002, 2007, 2008

Individual
Úrvalsdeild kvenna top goalscorer: 2003
NAIA Women's Soccer All-American second team: 2003

References

External links

1980 births
Living people
Hrefna Huld Johannesdottir
Hrefna Huld Johannesdottir
Hrefna Huld Johannesdottir
Women's association football forwards
Medkila IL (women) players
Hrefna Huld Johannesdottir
Hrefna Huld Johannesdottir
Hrefna Huld Johannesdottir